The Permanent Representatives' Committee of the African Union is made up of nominated representatives of member countries by the African Union.

Chair		-	Nigeria

1st Vice-Chair	-	Republic of Congo

2nd Vice-Chair	-	Rwanda

3rd Vice-Chair	-	Libya

Rapporteur	-	Botswana

They prepare the work for the Executive Council.

African Union